The Universal Masters Collection may refer to:

 The Universal Masters Collection (Grace Jones album), 2003
 The Universal Masters Collection: Luv', a 2001 album by Luv'